Lü Peng (born 1956) is a Chinese curator, critic and art historian. He has engaged extensively with Chinese modern and contemporary art for over thirty years.

Education
Lü was born in 1956 in Chongqing, Sichuan. He graduated from the Political Studies Department of Sichuan Normal University in 1982, and was awarded a PhD in Critical Art Theory from the China Academy of Art in 2004.

Career
Lü was Editor in Chief of the journal Theatre and Film from 1982–85 and subsequently served as Vice-Secretary of the Sichuan Dramatists Society from 1986–90. He then held the position of Executive Editor at the magazine Art & Market. In 1992, he was Artistic Director of the Guangzhou Biennale (officially titled the First Guangzhou Biennial Art Fair). His curatorial work includes: “A Gift to Marco Polo” (an event for the Venice Biennale, 2009), which showcased eight of China’s most prominent contemporary artists; “Reshaping History” (Beijing, 2010), a large-scale exposition presenting more than one thousand works by nearly two hundred of the most innovative Chinese artists of the first decade of the 21st century; and “Pure Views: New Painting from China” (Louise Blouin Foundation, Frieze, London, 2010), “Pure Views: New Painting from China” (Asian Art Museum, San Francisco, 2011); and the 2011 Chengdu Biennale.

Lü is Director of the Museum of Contemporary Art Chengdu, Director of ChinART, the management agency of Chinese art institutions, and is Associate Professor of the Department of Art History and Theory at the China Academy of Art, Hangzhou, Zhejiang Province. He is a consulting authority for a number of Chinese government organisations and mainland Chinese companies.

In 2017, he took on the roles of the President of L-Art University, Professor of Sichuan Fine Arts Institute, and Xi'an Academy of Fine Arts.

A History of Art in 20th-century China
The book A History of Art in 20th-century China is Lü Peng's monograph of modern Chinese art. In the preface, he confessed that he was influenced by many Western art history books and methodologies, while viewing and writing about Chinese art especially modern Chinese art in the age of globalisation, a set of localised theories was necessary:

Bibliography
 Modern European Aesthetics of Painting (Lingnan Fine Arts Press, 1989)
 Modern Painting: New Imagery Language (Shandong Literature and Art Press, 1987)
 Art-Revelation of Man (Lingnan Fine Arts Press, 1990)
 (with Yi Dan) Twentieth-Century Art Culture (Hunan Fine Arts Press, 1990)
 Critique of Modern Art and Culture (Sichuan Fine Arts Press, 1992); 
 (with Yi Dan) History of China Modern Art: 1979–1989 (Hunan Fine Arts Press, 1992)
 Art Operation (Chengdu Publishing House, 1994) 
 History of China Modern Art: 1990–1999 (Hunan Fine Arts Press, 2000)
 Pure Views--Remote from Streams and Mountain: Chinese Landscape Painting in the 10th–13th Centuries (Chinese People’s University Press, 2004); 
 A History of Art in Twentieth-Century China (Peking University Press, 2006; New Star Press, 2013)
 Artists in Art History (Hunan Fine Arts Press, 2008)
 The Story of “Art” in China (Peking University Press, 2010)
 A History of Art in China year by year [from 1900 to 2010], 2012, Chinese Young Publishing House
 Documents of Chinese art in Twentieth Century: A Sourcebook [with Kong Lin-wei], 2012

References

Living people
1956 births
Historians from Chongqing
Sichuan Normal University alumni
China Academy of Art alumni
Chinese art historians
People's Republic of China historians
Directors of museums in China